Great Sutton is a village on the Wirral Peninsula, in the unitary authority of Cheshire West and Chester and the ceremonial county of Cheshire, England. It is a suburb of Ellesmere Port and, as with Little Sutton to the north, was once a separate village that was incorporated into the town as it expanded outwards.

History
Great Sutton and Little Sutton were mentioned in a single entry in the Domesday Book of 1086 as Sudtone, under the ownership of the canons of St Werburgh's Abbey.

The village was part of the parish of Eastham in the Wirral Hundred, becoming part of Ellesmere Port civil parish in 1950. The population was recorded at 153 in 1801, 203 in 1851 and 397 in 1901.

Great Sutton is a residential area close to the A41 road that links Birkenhead and Chester. The White Swan Inn public house dates back to about 1850. The Church of St John the Evangelist on Chester Road (A41) was consecrated in November 1879.

The village was struck by an F1/T3 tornado on 23 November 1981, part of the record-breaking nationwide tornado outbreak on that day.

Geography
Great Sutton is in the southern part of the Wirral Peninsula and a suburban area of the town of Ellesmere Port.

Transport
The nearest railway stations are in Little Sutton (towards Ellesmere Port) and Capenhurst (towards Chester). Both stations are on the Wirral line of the Merseyrail network.

See also

Listed buildings in Great Sutton

References

External links

Villages in Cheshire
Areas of Ellesmere Port